The Canton of Vittel is a French administrative and electoral grouping of communes in the Vosges département of eastern France and in the region of Grand Est. The Canton of Vittel has its administrative centre at Vittel.

Composition
At the French canton reorganisation which came into effect in March 2015, the canton was expanded from 21 to 45 communes:

Aingeville
Aulnois
Auzainvilliers
Bazoilles-et-Ménil 
Belmont-sur-Vair
Bulgnéville
Contrexéville 
Crainvilliers
Dombrot-le-Sec
Dombrot-sur-Vair
Domèvre-sous-Montfort 
Domjulien
Estrennes 
Gemmelaincourt 
Gendreville
Hagnéville-et-Roncourt
Haréville 
Lignéville 
Malaincourt
Mandres-sur-Vair
Médonville
Monthureux-le-Sec 
Morville
La Neuveville-sous-Montfort
Norroy
Offroicourt 
Parey-sous-Montfort
Rancourt
Remoncourt 
Rozerotte 
Saint-Ouen-lès-Parey
Saint-Remimont
Saulxures-lès-Bulgnéville
Sauville
Suriauville
They-sous-Montfort
Thuillières 
Urville
La Vacheresse-et-la-Rouillie
Valfroicourt
Valleroy-le-Sec 
Vaudoncourt
Vittel 
Viviers-lès-Offroicourt  
Vrécourt

References

Vittel